Elise Hall (born 1989) is a Republican politician from Oklahoma. Hall was the Representative for District 100 in the Oklahoma House of Representatives. In April 2018, she announced that she would not seek re-election to the seat later that year.

Political career
Hall served in the Oklahoma House of Representatives until 2018.

Personal life
During her tenure, she was one of the youngest members of the Oklahoma House, having been sworn in at the age of 21, the youngest age allowed by the Oklahoma Constitution. She earned a marketing degree from the University of Central Oklahoma and works as Director of Marketing and Advertising for a local landscape company. She currently co-owns the Hall's Pizza Kitchen restaurant in the Midtown District of Oklahoma City.

References

External links
 Elise Hall campaign website

Living people
1989 births
Republican Party members of the Oklahoma House of Representatives
University of Central Oklahoma alumni
Politicians from Oklahoma City
Women state legislators in Oklahoma
21st-century American politicians
21st-century American women politicians